Diabolik: The Original Sin is an adventure game developed by Italian studio Artematica Entertainment and published by Black Bean Games in 2009 for PlayStation 2, Wii, Windows, Nintendo DS, and PSP, based on the Italian comic book series Diabolik.

Production 
The game was first announced on December 1, 2005 and the first screenshots were revealed on November 9, 2006.

Originally called Diabolik: Evil's Origin, it was later renamed to its current title.

Riccardo Cangini of Artematica said: "We are enthusiastic about being able to work on such a powerful character as Diabolik...we wish to carry out a game of profound impact and high quality". The creators wanted to "skillfully combine three-dimensional locations with the point & click interface, spatial models of characters and cartoon scenes".

Micro Application organised the game's distribution and localization in French on June 12. Akella had the rights to publish within Russia and other CIS countries. Black Bean Games and Koch Media published it into Spanish.

The PC release excluded Italian, French and Russian speaking territories.

In 2008, Black Bean acquired worldwide publishing rights to the console versions of the game.

Plot and gameplay 
The video game is based on the Italian comic book character Diabolik. When his girlfriend is held captive he is forced to steal a valuable work of art.

The game has a standard point and click interface, with some action elements.

A proprietary engine driving the game and a system of dynamic dialogs was created.

Critical reception 
Game Boomers felt that while the game was not award-worthy, it was enjoyable to see the character in a video game. Adventures Planet thought the stylistic point of view was one of the game's merits. Adventure Gamers gave praise to the suspenseful atmosphere. Adventure Classic Gaming felt that the game was competent without being particular impactful. Jeuxvideo thought that the game's plot was conventional, though still effective, that the game contained uninteresting puzzles and mini-games, and that the background music was pleasing.

Gamekult thought the game was too linear and scripted. Multiplayer.it felt it was a successful debut into the video gaming world for the character. Stop Game wrote that the plot, graphics, voice, puzzles were equally awful. Eurogamer felt that the game was ultimately unbalanced. 3D Juegos thought the game played as very slow. Vandal asserted that the game's character design emulated the comic book series. Igromania liked that the game copied the style of the work it was based on.

References

External links 

 Main page
 Making of

2009 video games
Adventure games
Nintendo DS games
PlayStation 2 games
PlayStation Portable games
Video games based on comics
Video games developed in Italy
Wii games
Windows games
Black Bean Games games
Single-player video games
Akella games